Geoffrey Cabeke (born 5 November 1988) is a Belgian defender, who currently plays for RWDM47.

References

External links

Belgian footballers
1988 births
Living people
K.V.C. Westerlo players
R.W.D.M. Brussels F.C. players
Belgian Pro League players
Challenger Pro League players
Association football defenders
RWDM47 players